is a railway station in the village of Tamakawa, Fukushima, Japan operated by East Japan Railway Company (JR East).

Lines

Station layout
The station has one side platform serving a single bi-directional track. The station formerly had two opposed side platforms, but one of the platforms is no longer in use.

History
Izumigō Station opened on December 4, 1934. The station was absorbed into the JR East network upon the privatization of the Japanese National Railways (JNR) on April 1, 1987.

Passenger statistics
In fiscal 2017, the station was used by an average of 116 passengers daily (boarding passengers only).

Surrounding area
Tamagawa Village Hall
 Tamagawa Post Office
Abukuma River

Fukushima Airport
The walk takes about 50 minutes from this station to the airport.

See also
 List of Railway Stations in Japan

References

External links

  

Stations of East Japan Railway Company
Railway stations in Fukushima Prefecture
Suigun Line
Railway stations in Japan opened in 1934
Tamakawa, Fukushima